Her Country First is a 1918 American comedy silent film directed by James Young and written by Edith Kennedy and Mary Roberts Rinehart. The film stars Vivian Martin, John Cossar, Florence Oberle, J. Parks Jones, Larry Steers, and Bernadine Zuber. The film was released on September 22, 1918, by Paramount Pictures.

There are no listings for this film in the Library of Congress's database which suggest that it is a lost film.

Plot
Dorothy Grant returns from boarding school so fired up with patriotism that she organizes her friends into a military company they call the Girls' Aviation Corps with help from a woman farmer who served in the military. Dorothy then discovers that German spies have come to town to get access to her father's munitions plant.

Cast
Vivian Martin as Dorothy Grant
John Cossar as Franklin Grant
Florence Oberle as Mrs. Grant
J. Parks Jones as Craig Allison
Larry Steers as Dr. Barnes
Bernadine Zuber as Isabelle Grant 
Louis Willoughby as The Butler, William 
Jim Farley as Henry The Chauffeur
Lillian Leighton as The Cook, Lena
Jack McDonald as Farmer
Audrey Chapman as Jane
Marcella Daly as Lucie

References

External links

1918 films
1910s English-language films
Silent American comedy films
1918 comedy films
Paramount Pictures films
Lost American films
Films directed by James Young
American black-and-white films
American silent feature films
Films based on works by Mary Roberts Rinehart
1918 lost films
Lost comedy films
1910s American films